Bakaluba is a surname. Notable people with the surname include:

Jane Bakaluba (born 1939), Ugandan novelist
 Bakaluba Mukasa Peter, member of the eighth Parliament of Uganda (2006–2011)

Surnames of African origin